The 1893 Limerick Senior Hurling Championship was the sixth staging of the Limerick Senior Hurling Championship since its establishment by the Limerick County Board in 1887.

Treaty Stones were the defending champions.

On 29 October 1893, Bruree won the championship after a 9-01 to 0-01 defeat of St. Michael's in the final. It was their first championship title.

Results

Final

Championship statistics

Miscellaneous

 Bruree win their first title and wouldn't do so again until 2006.

References

Limerick Senior Hurling Championship
Limerick Senior Hurling Championship